Parallax is a supervillain appearing in American comic books published by DC Comics.

Publication history
Created by writer Ron Marz and artist Darryl Banks for Green Lantern vol. 3 #48 (January 1994), Parallax was originally devised as the new supervillain identity for then-former Green Lantern protagonist Hal Jordan. After further changes for the Hal Jordan character over the subsequent years (sacrificing his life in order to reignite Earth's Sun in the 1996 crossover storyline "The Final Night", and Jordan's soul subsequently becoming the newest host of the Spectre in the 1999 miniseries Day of Judgment), 2004's Green Lantern: Rebirth once again cast Jordan as a heroic Green Lantern and explained Parallax as an ancient entity embodying the yellow light of fear which possessed Jordan and drove him to his villainous actions. Parallax was revealed to have been once imprisoned within the Central Power Battery on the planet Oa, from which all Green Lanterns derive their power, and was the reason for the necessary impurity that in the past rendered the rings useless against anything colored yellow.

In 2009, Parallax was ranked as IGN's 92nd Greatest Comic Book Villain of All Time.

Fictional character biography

In 1994, in an effort to generate interest in its Green Lantern comics, DC replaced Hal Jordan, who had been the primary Green Lantern since the late 1950s, with the character Kyle Rayner, and eliminated the Green Lantern Corps which had served as supporting characters in the series. This was done in the story "Emerald Twilight", beginning in Green Lantern vol. 3 #48 (Jan. 1994). Following the complete destruction of his home town Coast City by the villain Mongul, Hal Jordan descends into madness, destroying the Green Lantern Corps, killing his friend Kilowog and all of the Guardians, except for Ganthet. After this, Jordan assumed the name Parallax and became a supervillain. As detailed in the crossover Zero Hour: Crisis in Time, Parallax attempted to rewrite history in order to stop the destruction of Coast City by using chronal energy, pulled from the universe by the combined power of the rings of the Green Lanterns he had killed. While Kyle Rayner became the primary Green Lantern of Earth for the next decade, Hal Jordan terrorized the DC universe as the villain Parallax and attempted to make the Cyborg Superman pay for the destruction of Coast City.

Hal eventually sacrificed his life to reignite Earth's sun after it was nearly completely eaten. His soul not at peace, Hal then became the new Spectre to seek redemption for what he did as Parallax. The 2004 miniseries Green Lantern: Rebirth, written by Geoff Johns and penciled by Ethan Van Sciver, revealed that Parallax was actually a parasitic entity dating back to the dawn of time and born from the yellow of the emotional spectrum. The parasite was the sentient embodiment of fear, traveling from world to world and causing entire civilizations to destroy themselves out of paranoia.

The Guardians of the Universe imprisoned Parallax within the Central Power Battery on Oa using fear's opposite energy, willpower, along with the aid of one of the fear's counterparts, Ion. Parallax had lain dormant for billions of years, its true nature hidden by the Guardians to prevent anyone from trying to free it. Being yellow in color, Parallax eventually came to be referred to as simply "the yellow impurity", a flaw, whose nature was kept secret from the Corps, that made their rings useless against the color yellow: Parallax weakened its power over the corresponding spectrum; hence, only someone with the willpower to overcome great fear could master the power ring. Thus, when recruiting new Green Lanterns, the Guardians were careful to look for recruits who could do this. When the renegade Sinestro was later imprisoned in the Power Battery himself, his Qwardian yellow power ring tapped into Parallax's power and awakened it.

Since Sinestro harbored hatred for Hal, Parallax chose Jordan as its tool to free itself. Parallax apparently spent years influencing Jordan, causing him to experience increasing self-doubt as well as causing his hair to prematurely whiten at the temples. Jordan's grief over the destruction of Coast City let Parallax influence Jordan's subsequent murderous activity, his apparent killing of Sinestro (actually a hard light construct), and Jordan's destruction of the Central Power Battery.

After it was learned something amiss was happening on Oa, a task force (as shown in the Emerald Fallout series), which consisted of Guy Gardner, Wonder Woman, Captain Atom, Alan Scott, the Martian Manhunter, Ferrin Colos of the Darkstars, and Arisia, ventured to Oa to discover the cause of Guy Gardner's visions of its destruction that were brought about by him wielding Sinestro's power ring (which was also fueled by the power expelled by the Guardians, their rings, batteries, or Parallax himself). On Oa, the task force confronted Hal, but he easily defeated them. Only Alan Scott and Guy Gardner were even able to get a hit on Jordan. Guy proved to be the most effective against Jordan because he could absorb the energy that Jordan was using against him in the battle. Jordan still managed to quickly overpower Guy and destroy his Qwardian power ring. Jordan proceeded to send the whole task force (who were all knocked out from the beating they suffered) back to Earth.

Since Parallax was gone from the Oan Power Battery, the final power ring conferred to Kyle Rayner did not have any weakness against yellow. The young ring bearer also has some limited resistance to the fear entity's influence as Rayner is a Green Lantern who understands fear, and has the requisite strong will of a ring bearer. Despite being possessed by Parallax, the positive aspect of Jordan's personality would resurface occasionally, eventually leading the infected Jordan to use Parallax's powers to reignite the Sun during the event known as "The Final Night", and later aiding the universe's heroes to stop the rogue angel Asmodel from raising Hell to Earth and Heaven in Day of Judgment. Jordan's infected soul later bonded with the Spectre, who knew Parallax's true nature from the start and eventually expelled it from Jordan. The Spectre-Force itself left to search for its next human host. Ganthet guided Jordan's soul back to his own body, preserved after Jordan reignited the Sun. His soul and thoughts finally gaining clarity for the first time in years, Jordan was resurrected, again taking his place as a Green Lantern. Together, Kyle Rayner and fellow Green Lanterns John Stewart, Guy Gardner, a resurrected Kilowog, Hal Jordan, and Ganthet imprisoned the parasite back in the Central Power Battery on Oa.

Despite this reintroduction of the "yellow impurity", which is now referred to as the "Parallax Fear Anomaly", the power rings' weakness against yellow no longer applies, as experienced wielders are now able to consciously recognize its source, and overcome the fear associated with it. It is still, however, a considerable weakness for new Green Lantern recruits and rookies, who must be taught the impurity's nature and how to combat it. During training, new recruits' rings may falter at times against yellow objects, and/or when a recruit is experiencing panic or fear.

Sinestro Corps
 
Sinestro's Sinestro Corps captures Kyle Rayner with the intention of making him Parallax's new host. Sinestro reveals to Kyle the existence of Ion. Sinestro also informs him that Ion is actually an energy entity that needs a host, similar to Parallax, and it is now attached to Kyle's soul. Sinestro removes the Ion entity from Kyle, who is immediately taken over by Parallax. Parallax then clothes itself in a new uniform (which appears as a combination of Kyle's original Green Lantern costume and the costume Hal Jordan wore as Parallax) and returns to Qward with the Sinestro Corps. Parallax becomes a herald of the reborn Anti-Monitor alongside Hank Henshaw, Superman-Prime, and Sinestro himself. After the massacre of several Green Lanterns, Parallax leads an assault against Hal Jordan, John Stewart, and Guy Gardner, and brings them to Qward. The "Lost Lanterns" arrive to rescue the captured Lanterns. During the battle, Parallax murders Jack T. Chance after making him experience his repressed fear of his abusive family. During his possession by Parallax, Kyle witnesses everything that Parallax does, including his murder of Jack. Kyle and Parallax confront each other in a room constructed by Kyle's memories. Kyle changes into Ion and fights Parallax and later conjures a power ring and his original costume. After fighting Parallax for a while, Kyle stabs Parallax with a pencil and regains his self-worth when he sees a painting that his mother painted several years ago. Kyle walks into the painting and ends up in a field walking towards a bright, green star.

Later on Earth, Parallax is about to kill Hal's brother and family when Hal confronts him just before his power ring runs out of power. Hal then tries to free Kyle by reminding him of how fearless his mother was even on her deathbed. Parallax then absorbs Hal into himself; this twofold increase of his powers upon combining the strength of both of his hosts turns him his natural yellow color and develop a costume that more closely resembles the one he wore when Jordan was his only host. Soon after, Guy comes to Parallax with Kyle's mother's painting. This, along with Hal's aid, allows Kyle to fight Parallax from within, and the two manage to escape from Parallax. Now in its original form, Parallax begins to attack Hal, Guy, John, and Kyle. Ganthet and Sayd arrive and imprison Parallax within the Earth Lanterns' four Power Batteries. The effects of Parallax within the four Power Batteries has yet to be revealed.

It was revealed in the third part of the Agent Orange arc that Parallax was once sealed in a box that Larfleeze had stolen from the Guardians of the Universe. The box was returned to the Guardians in exchange for the orange light of avarice.

Blackest Night

While Jordan and his allies defend Coast City against the Black Lantern Corps during the "Blackest Night" storyline, the Black Lantern Spectre attempts to claim him. Believing that the Spectre fears Parallax, Hal Jordan has Ganthet summon the power batteries that currently held it. Once summoned, Hal allows Sinestro to release Parallax and, once it is free, provokes it into merging with him. A resulting explosion of yellow light quickly fades and soon reveals that Parallax is in full control of Hal and eager to challenge the Spectre once more. Parallax tears into the Black Lantern Spectre's body, freeing the real Spectre and destroying the facsimile. Parallax then attempts to destroy the Spectre, who uses his own fear for it, coupled with the love Carol Ferris feels for Hal, to separate Parallax from its host. Parallax is then pulled away by an unknown force to an unknown location.

After Sinestro becomes a White Lantern, he views the history of the emotional spectrum, and discovers that the first creature in existence to feel fear had evolved into Parallax.

Brightest Day

During the "Brightest Day" storyline, Parallax is revealed to have been transported to planet Ryut, where a cloaked villain trapped the fear entity in some kind of energy bubble and chained it to a monolith bearing the Sinestro Corps symbol. Around Parallax are other monoliths bearing the symbols of the other Lantern corps. Later, when Hal Jordan, the Flash (Barry Allen), and the rest of their allies try to find the emotional entities, they locate Parallax (apparently under the command of the mysterious figure) and the Scarlet Speedster becomes the latest host for the fear entity after it senses the hero's concerns for Jordan's safety from it. By inhabiting the living generator of the Speed Force, Parallax is even more powerful by combining the extradimensional energy the speedster creates with its own powers. Despite this, the embodiment of fear still desires Hal Jordan as its host as they fight. However, an intervention by the mystery villain prevents Parallax's attempts, and reveals that Jordan now has the skills to resist it anyway. As the embodiment of compassion, Proselyte, began to free the Flash from Parallax's control by reigniting his emotion for compassion over his fear, the embodiment of hope, Adara, began fighting the cloaked villain, who reveals that all this is actually a ruse so that he could capture them all — which he does — revealing himself to be the renegade Guardian Krona.

War of the Green Lanterns
When Krona attacks Oa, he places Parallax inside the Central Power Battery, restoring the yellow impurity and giving him control over almost all Green Lanterns. Hal, John, Guy and Kyle are able to resist Parallax's influence due to their past experience with it, using the rings of the other six Corps to fight off Krona's forces long enough for Guy using the rings of the Red Lantern Corps and the Star Sapphires simultaneously to tear the Central Power Battery's shell away and remove Parallax. After Krona's defeat, Parallax escaped along with the other entities and is currently at large in the universe.

The New 52
In September 2011, The New 52 rebooted DC's continuity. In this new timeline, it is shown that Parallax is in the Yellow Central Power Battery where the entity stays until he is released by Sinestro at the conclusion of the "Wrath of the First Lantern" story. In order to destroy the First Lantern Volthoom, Sinestro allows Parallax to possess his body. Contrary to previous hosts of Parallax, this time, however, Sinestro is in control of the entity instead of the other way around. Their effort in defeating Volthoom, however, proves to be unsuccessful, with Volthoom only being defeated when Hal returns as a Black Lantern and summons Nekron to restore Volthoom's mortality. After Volthoom's defeat, Sinestro as Parallax proceeds to kill the Guardians of the Universe, sparing only Ganthet and Sayd in the process. Sinestro then states his intention to travel far from Oa and release Parallax.

In the "Lights Out" story, the Entity reveals that all embodiments are dying and they must return to the place of their origin, except Parallax because it is currently entrapped. In the aftermath, it is revealed that Parallax is still bonded with Sinestro, who controls the entity. Later, Sinestro releases and separate Parallax within the core of Warworld's base, trying to prevent the destruction of the new headquarters of Sinestro Corps, after the Green Lantern Corps were apparently dissolved.

DC Rebirth
In 2016, DC Comics implemented another relaunch of its books called DC Rebirth, which restored its continuity to a form much as it was prior to The New 52. Parallax is being hosted by Sinestro again as he has plans to rule the universe with fear. The power of Parallax is increased by Sinestro to one thousand percent of the power of fear to face Hal Jordan, who has returned as Green Lantern. Before Sinestro attacks him, he discovers too late that his and Parallax's powers have decreased due to Soranik Natu rescuing people from being imprisoned and escaping with them. Hal then uses his energies as a living construct to incinerate the Fear Warlord. Sinestro tries to use Parallax's powers to stop Hal, but fails as Hal destroys the base of the Sinestro Corps, Warworld, seemingly killing both Sinestro and Parallax in the process.

Parallax is revealed to have survived and found its way to Earth, having shrunk in size. It starts kidnapping children to feed on their fear and regain its strength and power. The entity possesses the body of one of the children, Zachariah Ferruci, and kidnaps another child until they are found by Superman. Parallax uses the children to fight back against Superman and flees. The next day, Parallax welcomes Superman to the place where it is keeping the children. Parallax transforms into his normal size and reveals to Superman who he is. Parallax tries to possess Superman, but Superman is able to force it out. However, Parallax begins draining the children's lives, forcing Superman to submit. Parallax possesses Superman and as it claims that nothing can hurt it anymore, Parallax is struck from behind by Sinestro, who has returned to claim it for himself. During the fight, Parallax refuses to possess Sinestro for this action, so Sinestro teleports to Qward, as the Weaponers are to restrain the entity. While Parallax apparently possesses Superman, he is contained as Sinestro attempts to remove Parallax from Superman; however, Superman tells him that he is not under Parallax's control. Parallax is possessing the Weaponers to attack Sinestro. Parallax separates from the Weaponers and tries to escape. Sinestro fails to capture Parallax and so his power is drained and he collapses; then, Superman takes his yellow ring and files into Parallax's mouth. Superman uses his fear to imprison Parallax within the yellow ring, while Sinestro is no match for Superman and flees.

Later, Superman waits for Hal Jordan to return to Earth, explaining the previous fight with Parallax. Hal imprisons Parallax within a yellow ring for transportation back to Mogo.

Powers and abilities

Parallax has immense fear-casting and mind-control powers, strong enough to easily frighten and control the likes of Superman, Wonder Woman, and even a being like the Spectre, except those who are capable of understanding and conquering inner fear such as Hal Jordan, Kyle Rayner or Batman. However, it was unable to control Alan Scott, even though he experienced fear from Parallax (Abin Sur explains that in humans fear is intellectual, which may have something to do with the ineffectuality of Parallax's powers and the fear entity itself mentioned that Alan's power differs from the fear entity, the Guardians, and the Green Lantern Corps, as they derive their powers from the emotional spectrum), although he did experience a fever which led him to increasingly weaken during Parallax's attempts. It can take possession of someone's body when they feel even the slightest fear. Parallax is also capable of creating solid light constructs, such as creating a convincing duplicate of Sinestro for Hal Jordan to kill. Parallax can create both green and yellow objects or creatures. As a being of pure energy, Parallax has no true physical form of its own; it generally changes into forms that will instill fear in its victims.

Other versions
 In Booster Gold (vol. 2) #2 (2007), one panel shows an alternate timeline where the Sinestro Corps are formed years earlier than they should have been. In this alternate timeline, Tomar-Re is Parallax's host.
 In JLA/Avengers, the Parallax-possessed Hal Jordan makes a brief appearance, flying into a rage after the apparent death of Barry Allen and Clint Barton during the fight with Krona, but the chronal chaos throughout the battlefield quickly replaces him with Kyle Rayner.
 In the Convergence crossover, when the alternate Brainiac miniaturized the universe of Zero Hour, Parallax loses his powers and Hal Jordan returns to his senses. Wanting to atone for the crimes and sins he committed, Hal has himself jailed within the 8th Police Precinct, and is visited regularly by Kyle Rayner. Hal Jordan becomes Parallax again after the dome of Telos releases the city in which Kyle Rayner as the Green Lantern is the only thing standing between Hal Jordan as Parallax and the oncoming doom Parallax plans to unleash upon Electropolis. Parallax confronts Deimos, sick of being trapped on the planet but is attacked by the latter. When Deimos claims that nothing can stop him, Parallax attacks and chastises him for using his powers for his own selfish needs and destroys him. Afterwards, he threatens Telos to return everyone to their respective universes, but all the power Deimos took is suddenly released and will shatter the multiverse. Parallax offers to save them but Telos stops him, refusing to let Parallax cause another Zero Hour-level event. Parallax chooses to go back to the Crisis on Infinite Earths with the pre-Crisis Flash, pre-Crisis Supergirl, and the Pre-Flashpoint Superman and Lois Lane, to help prevent it from collapsing the multiverse, and to also redeem himself for the actions he has committed. Brainiac senses that the group were successful. After preventing the Crisis on Infinite Earths, Parallax (along with the Pre-Flashpoint Superman and Lois Lane) finds himself on the New 52 Prime Earth and witnesses the Justice League's first fight with Darkseid. Parallax considered killing the New 52 Hal Jordan/Green Lantern but decided not to when he realized how happy Carol Ferris was with Hal, and he could not take that away from her. Parallax decided to find Telos and get his help. Parallax finds Telos and rescues him from an Alliance Fleet, destroying them in the process. He reveals that he wants to use the Rosetta Stone of Time that Telos has to create his own Coast City. He offers Telos the location of the latter's family but it is all a ruse and Parallax contains Telos and uses the stone to begin the creation of his Coast City.
 During The New 52, while Hal is acting as a solo agent using an old gauntlet prototype for the rings, he is confronted by a version of himself as Parallax, apparently from the point when he was preparing to restructure time who has been drawn into the future. Proclaiming that he will protect this Coast City to ensure that Hal's 'weakness' will never cause him to fail it again, Parallax-Hal attacks Hal despite his efforts to explain what is actually happening to his 'past' self, but the gauntlet is somehow able to drive Parallax away.
 In the Star Trek/Green Lantern crossover series - where key members of the Green Lantern Corps and other ring-wielders are transferred into the new Star Trek universe after an attack by Nekron - Sinestro makes his way to Oa after uncovering evidence that it exists in his new universe, where he attacks the Central Power Battery and absorbs Parallax into himself.

In other media

Film

 Parallax appears in Green Lantern, voiced by Clancy Brown and motion-captured by an uncredited T. J. Storm. This version feeds on life forces via organisms' fear and was created when Krona became corrupted by the yellow energy of fear when he failed to control it. Abin Sur imprisoned the entity on the remote planet Ryut, but it later escapes and seeks revenge on the Green Lantern Corps, absorbing fear and life forces from multiple inhabited planets to strengthen itself and killing Abin in the process. After the Department of Extranormal Operations (DEO) recover Abin's body, task Hector Hammond with performing the autopsy, and Hammond gets infected by Parallax's DNA, it uses him in an attempt to kill Abin's successor Hal Jordan. However, Hammond fails and Parallax kills him upon reaching Earth and goes on a rampage until Jordan lures it away from Earth, tricking it into being absorbed by the sun.
 Parallax appears in Green Lantern: Beware My Power, voiced by Nolan North. This version is an alien parasite created by Sinestro to infect a weakened Hal Jordan. Initially meant to bend Jordan to Sinestro's will, Parallax instead twisted his mind and empowered him while Sinestro submitted to it and became its acolyte. Parallax intends to use Jordan's body to obtain godhood, but the latter is killed by the Green Arrow.

Video games
Parallax appears as a boss in DC Universe Online, in which it possesses Sinestro, Arkillo, Kilowog, and Hal Jordan.

Miscellaneous
Parallax appears in Smallville: Lantern. After corrupting Hal Jordan, this version goes on to kill Kyle Rayner and Guy Gardner, reprogram the Manhunters to serve as its heralds, and send Yellow Lantern rings to Earth to combat the Green Lantern Corps.

References

External links
 
 Alan Kistler's profile on Green Lantern
 The Origin of Parallax at DC Comics.com

Characters created by Ethan Van Sciver
Characters created by Geoff Johns
Characters created by Ron Marz
Comics characters introduced in 1994
DC Comics aliens
DC Comics characters who have mental powers
DC Comics deities
DC Comics extraterrestrial supervillains
DC Comics film characters
Fear
Fictional mass murderers
Fictional monsters
Fictional characters who can manipulate light
Fictional characters who can manipulate reality
Fictional characters who can manipulate time
Fictional characters with elemental transmutation abilities
Fictional characters with energy-manipulation abilities
Fictional characters with spirit possession or body swapping abilities
Green Lantern characters
Merged fictional characters